Gibberella avenacea is a fungal plant pathogen.

References

External links 
 USDA ARS Fungal Database

avenacea
Fungal plant pathogens and diseases
Fungi described in 1967